Brenda Ekwurzel (born 1963) is an American climate scientist. She is director of climate science for the Union of Concerned Scientists. She is an American Association for the Advancement of Science fellow.

Biography 
Ekwurzel has a B.S. in geology from Smith College. In 1998 she received an M.S. from Rutgers University where she worked on the movement of sediment. She went on to earn a Ph.D. from Columbia University / Lamont–Doherty Earth Observatory(1988) where she tracked water masses in the Arctic. Following her Ph.D. she was a postdoctoral researcher at Lawrence Livermore National Laboratory. She then moved to the University of Arizona.

In 2019, she was a keynote speaker at the Weber State University Sustainability Summit.

She testified before the United States Congress about climate change in 2019. She has spoken about the National Climate Assessment with the media.

Selected publications

Awards and honors 
In 2016 she was elected a fellow of the American Association for the Advancement of Science.

References

External links 
 Brenda Ekwurzel interview – will Harvey change Trump’s thinking? 29 August 2017
What You Can Do About Climate Change Here and Now, wbur, September 22, 2016

American climatologists
Women atmospheric scientists
1963 births
Living people
Date of birth missing (living people)
Place of birth missing (living people)
Columbia University alumni
Rutgers University alumni
Fellows of the American Association for the Advancement of Science